Louis Jurine (6 February 1751 – 20 October 1819) was a Swiss physician, surgeon and naturalist mainly interested in entomology. He lived in Geneva.

Surgeon
He studied surgery in Paris and quickly acquired a great reputation for his expertise in medicine and natural history beyond that which he had in Geneva. He taught courses in anatomy and surgery at the Société des Arts in Geneva and was made honorary professor of zoology at the Academy (today: University of Geneva). He also founded a maternity hospice in 1807 and was awarded prizes for his work on the gasses of the human body, artificial feeding of infants, and pectoral angina.

Naturalist
Upon learning of  Spallanzani's experiments with bats, in which Spallanzani showed that bats do not rely on sight when navigating in darkness, Jurine conducted a series of experiments from which he concluded that bats use sound to navigate in darkness.

Collections
Jurine’s collections of Hymenoptera, Coleoptera, Lepidoptera and Hemiptera are in the Natural History Museum of Geneva.

Works
 Nouvelle méthode de classer les Hyménoptères et les Diptères. Hyménoptères. Genève (J.J. Paschoud) 1807. (Only 250 copies of this work were issued.) PDF
 Observations sur les ailes des hyménoptères. Mem. Accad. Sci. Torino 24 (1820): 177–214.
 Histoire des monocles, qui se trouvent aux environs de Genève. I-XVI, 1-260, 22 plates, Genève (J.J. Paschoud) 1820. PDF

See also
:Category:Taxa named by Louis Jurine

References

 Sigrist, René; Barras, Vincent; Ratcliff, Marc, Louis Jurine, chirurgien et naturaliste (1751–1819) (Chêne-Bourg, Switzerland: Bibliothèque d'Histoire des Sciences, 1999). [in French] (with list of works)

External links
 Zoologica Göttingen State and University Library

1751 births
1819 deaths
18th-century scientists from the Republic of Geneva
Physicians from the Republic of Geneva
Hymenopterists
Swiss entomologists
Swiss naturalists
Swiss surgeons
 01